In enzymology, a D-tryptophan N-malonyltransferase is an enzyme that catalyzes the chemical reaction

malonyl-CoA + D-tryptophan  CoA + N2-malonyl-D-tryptophan

Thus, the two substrates of this enzyme are malonyl-CoA and D-tryptophan, whereas its two products are CoA and N2-malonyl-D-tryptophan.

This enzyme belongs to the family of transferases, specifically those acyltransferases transferring groups other than aminoacyl groups.  The systematic name of this enzyme class is malonyl-CoA:D-tryptophan N-malonyltransferase.

References

 

EC 2.3.1
Enzymes of unknown structure